Subprotelater is a genus of click beetles in the family Elateridae, the sole genus of the subfamily Subprotelaterinae. There are at least two described species in Subprotelater.

Species
These two species belong to the genus Subprotelater:
 Subprotelater hisamatsui
 Subprotelater japonicus

References

Elateridae
Taxa described in 1916